Scopula rufomixtaria  is a moth of the family Geometridae. It is found in France and on the Iberian Peninsula.

Subspecies
Scopula rufomixtaria rufomixtaria
Scopula rufomixtaria saharensis (Hausmann, 1993)

References

External links
Lepiforum.de

Moths described in 1863
rufomixtaria
Moths of Europe
Taxa named by Adolphe Hercule de Graslin